Hal Corley is an American television writer and playwright. He was Associate Head Writer for All My Children and As The World Turns, for which he won five Daytime Emmy Awards and two Writers Guild of America Awards. His plays have been developed with the Seattle Repertory Theatre, Syracuse Stage, Walnut Street Theatre, Premiere Stages, Atlanta's Alliance Theatre, New York's Westbeth, San Francisco's New Conservatory Theatre Center, Adirondack Theatre Festival, Washington DC's Source, Stageworks/Hudson, Los Angeles' New American Theatre, and Ontario's Flush Ink. Three full-length scripts, Easter Monday, Mama and Jack Carew, and ODD, are published by Samuel French/Concord Theatricals. His Fanny Otcott, an adaptation of a sketch by Thornton Wilder, is published by YouthPLAYS; his Treed is in Playscripts' Great Short Plays Volume 10; and his Dolor is included in Applause's Best American Short Plays for 2014-2015. His work is excerpted in Smith & Krause's Best Stage Scenes of 2008 and Best Men's/Women's Stage Scenes and Monologues of 2011, 222 More Comedy Monologues (2017), and in Samuel French's Exceptional Monologues 2. He is a member of the Dramatists Guild and the Writers Guild of America, East.

Awards and nominations

Television

Playwriting awards

References

External links

www.sfgate.com
Doollee Profile
PlayWorksOnline
 Samuel French store for three of Corley's plays

American soap opera writers
American male television writers
American dramatists and playwrights
American theatre directors
Year of birth missing (living people)
Living people
American male dramatists and playwrights